William Pocock may refer to:
 William Pocock (cricketer), English cricketer
 William Willmer Pocock, British architect
 Bill Pocock, English footballer